Horst Freese (born 30 January 1944) is a retired German speed skater. He finished in ninth place in the 1000 m at the 1976 Winter Olympics and fell on 500 m. 

He was born and raised in East Germany, but in 1969 fled to West Germany. 

Personal bests: 
500 m – 38.7 (1972)
 1000 m – 1:19.80 (1976)
 1500 m – 2:07.78 (1974)
 5000 m – 8:12.4 (1967)
 10000 – 17:28.5 (1966)

References

External links
Horst Freese (GDR). schaatsstatistieken.nl

1944 births
Living people
German male speed skaters
Olympic speed skaters of West Germany
Speed skaters at the 1976 Winter Olympics
People from Rostock
East German defectors
East German emigrants to West Germany